Herman Schultz (born 6 May 1901, date of death unknown) was a Monegasque sports shooter. He competed at the 1924, 1936, 1948 and 1952 Summer Olympics.

References

External links
 

1901 births
Year of death missing
Monegasque male sport shooters
Olympic shooters of Monaco
Shooters at the 1924 Summer Olympics
Shooters at the 1936 Summer Olympics
Shooters at the 1948 Summer Olympics
Shooters at the 1952 Summer Olympics
Place of birth missing